"Put Your Hands Together" is a song recorded by The O'Jays song in 1973 for their album Ship Ahoy, which peaked at number 10 on the Billboard Hot 100 and number 2 on the Billboard Hot Soul Singles chart. 
The song reached #47 in Canada.
It is their third song to reach the top 10 of the Hot 100 after "Back Stabbers" and "Love Train".

References

External links
 Lyrics of this song
 

1973 songs
1973 singles
The O'Jays songs
Songs written by Kenny Gamble
Songs written by Leon Huff
Gospel songs